Gordonia malaquae is a bacterium from the genus Gordonia which has been isolated from sludge from a wastewater treatment plant in Taiwan.

References

External links
Type strain of Gordonia malaquae at BacDive -  the Bacterial Diversity Metadatabase	

Mycobacteriales
Bacteria described in 2007